Zoltán Kovács (born 2 January 1964) is a Hungarian former sport shooter who competed in the 1988 Summer Olympics.

References

1964 births
Living people
Hungarian male sport shooters
ISSF pistol shooters
Olympic shooters of Hungary
Shooters at the 1988 Summer Olympics
Olympic bronze medalists for Hungary
Olympic medalists in shooting
Medalists at the 1988 Summer Olympics
20th-century Hungarian people